Babb Airport  is a public use airport in Glacier County, Montana, United States. It is owned by the Blackfeet Nation and located one nautical mile (2 km) southeast of the central business district of Babb, Montana, a community on the Blackfeet Indian Reservation.

Facilities and aircraft 
Babb Airport covers an area of 91 acres (37 ha) at an elevation of 4,518 feet (1,377 m) above mean sea level. It has one runway designated 14/32 with a turf surface measuring 3,860 by 110 feet (1,177 x 34 m).

For the 12-month period ending September 15, 2009, the airport had 250 aircraft operations, an average of 20 per month: 80% general aviation and 20% air taxi.

See also 
 List of airports in Montana

References

External links 
 Aerial image as of August 1995 from USGS The National Map
 

Airports in Montana
Native American airports
Transportation in Glacier County, Montana
Buildings and structures in Glacier County, Montana